The 1872 Coleridge by-election was a by-election held on 23 July 1872 in the  electorate in the Canterbury region of New Zealand during the 5th New Zealand Parliament.

The by-election was caused by the resignation of the incumbent MP John Karslake Karslake on 12 April 1872.

The by-election was won by William Bluett, by the narrow margin of seven votes (with several votes not allowed as electors were either not qualified or arrived late).

Results

References

Coleridge 1872
1872 elections in New Zealand
Politics of Canterbury, New Zealand
July 1872 events